The Vagabond of Limbo (French: Le Vagabond des Limbes) is a French science-fiction comic book series written by Christian Godard and illustrated by Julio Ribera, and published by Dargaud. It ran between 1975 and 2003.

Concept
It follows the adventures of Axel Moonshine, once known as "The Great Conciliator", and his companion Musky, child of the Prince of the Eternauts. Banished from his world for breaking the Thirteenth Commandment ("thou shalt not cross the threshold of sleep"), Axel roams the universe, searching for the woman he met in his dreams, Chimera, who seems to be trapped in a world resembling ours. Axel Moonshine sees Musky as a boy, but in fact, she is a girl in her puberty, and he does not seem to realize she is attracted to him. Musky does not grow up until she decides to age for the one who she fell in love with. It is suggested that Chimeer is Musky as an adult woman.

Volumes

Original volumes in French 
 Volume 1: Le vagabond des limbes (The Vagabond of Limbo) (1975)
 Volume 2: L'Empire des soleils noirs (Empire of Dark Suns) (1976)
 Volume 3: Les Charognards du cosmos (The Cosmos Scavengers) (1976)
 Volume 4: Les Démons du temps immobile (Demons of Still Time) (1978)
 Volume 5: L'Alchimiste suprême (An Ultimate Alchemist) (1979)
 Volume 6: Quelle réalité papa? (What is Reality, Papa?) (1980)
 Volume 7: La Guerre des Bonkes (The Bonkes War) (1981)
 Volume 8: Pour trois graines d'éternité (For three Seeds of Eternity) (1981)
 Volume 9: Le Labyrinthe virginal (The Virgin Labyrinth) (1982)
 Volume 10: Le Dernier Prédateur (The Last Predator) (1983)
 Volume 11: Le Masque de Kohm (The Mask of Kohm) (1984)
 Volume 12: Les Loups de Kohm (The Wolves of Kohm) (1985)
 Volume 13: L'Enfant-roi d'Onirodyne (The Child-King of Onirodyne) (1986)
 Volume 14: La Petite Maîtresse (The Little Mistress) (1987)
 Volume 15: Le Temps des oracles (Time of the Oracles) (1988)
 Volume 16: Le Dépotoir des étoiles (Junkyard of the Stars) (1988)
 Volume 17: La Martingale céleste (The Celestial Martingale) (1989)
 Volume 18: Les Contrebandiers du futur (Smugglers of the Future) (1989)
 Volume 19: Un tramway nommé délire (A Streetcar Named Delirium) (1990)
 Volume 20: Un certain monsieur KO (A Certain Mister Ko) (1990)
 Volume 21: La Décharge (The Dumping Ground) (1990)
 Volume 22: Le Solitaire (The Lonely One) (1992)
 Volume 23: La Rupture (Breaking Up) (1993)
 Volume 24: Muskie, encore, et toujours… (Muskee, once more and always…) (1995)
 Volume 25: Le Petit Clone (The Little Clone) (1996)
 Volume 26: Le Point de non retour (Point of No Return) (1997)
 Volume 27: Le Monde à l'envers (The World Backwards) (1998)
 Volume 28: Le Carnaval des animonstres (Carnival of Animonsters) (1999)
 Volume 29: La Réconciliation (Making Up) (2000)
 Volume 30: Le Retour vers Xantl (Return to Xantl) (2001)
 Volume 31: La Planète des prodiges (The Planet of Wonders) (2003)
 Volume 32: L'Engrenage (unofficial approximate translation: "The Chain of Events" or "The Trap") (unpublished)

In addition, eleven compilation volumes have been released as of July, 2007.

English translations 
Two volumes have been published in English by Dargaud USA.
 What is Reality, Papa? (1981) 
 An Ultimate Alchemist (1983)

References

External links
 Axel Moonshine, The Vagabond of Limbo Dead link!
 A music video showing images from various episodes (from Hungarian translation)

French comics
1975 comics debuts
2003 comics endings
Science fiction comics
Pilote titles
Dargaud titles